Martin Rendel (born 1968 in Limburg an der Lahn) is a German cultural manager and university professor. Innovation through intercultural and interdisciplinary cooperation is the main focus of his work.

Biography 
Rendel studied industrial design at the Darmstadt University of Applied Sciences (h_da), Germany, and communication design at Art Center College in La Tour-de-Peilz, Switzerland. During his studies he worked in the design studios of Aldo Cibic (Milan), Matteo Thun (Milan) and Dieter Sieger (Harkotten Castle, Sassenberg). His final work, a water-closet, attracted a great deal of media interest after AP photographer Karsten Thielker became aware of the project during a private stay in Darmstadt in 1992 and had the photos distributed via Associated Press. TV presenter Roger Willemsen then invited Rendel to his talk show "0137" while Sueddeutsche Zeitung celebrated the work as a "cultural revolution".

As winner of an international design competition, Rendel was invited to France after his studies on a Moulinex scholarship, which led to an encounter with the architect Isabelle Galzin. Both opened a studio for design and communication, first in Hamburg (1994) and then in Paris (1996). They collaborated with Federico Restrepo and clients such as Yves Saint Laurent, Gucci Parfum, Fred Joaillier and others.

From 1996 to 1999, Rendel was also involved as Art Director in an art project on rails initiated by the Italian sculptor Gianpaolo d'Andrea Moravecchia and the Amsterdam artists' association "Stichting de Blinde Schilders", which took a train as a rolling exhibition through Europe (Denmark, Greece, Yugoslavia, Hungary, Austria, Poland and Holland).

In 1998 Rendel founded the advertising agency rendel & spitz together with the communications consultant René Spitz, which in 2006 became a consultancy for strategic brand management. From 2001 to 2006, the office building (architects: b&k+ / Arno Brandlhuber, Bernd Kniess), Cologne's narrowest building on Eigelstein 115, offered space for installations during the Cologne furniture fair IMM as part of the so-called Passagen programme. Designers and architects like Konstantin Grcic (Munich), Johanna Grawunder (San Francisco), Timo Salli (Helsinki), Ross Lovegrove (London), Greg Lynn (Los Angeles), Tokujin Yoshioka (Tokyo), Andrea Branzi (Milan), Ronan & Erwan Bouroullec (Paris) and Stefan Ytterborn (Stockholm) took part in this programme. The Pinakothek der Moderne in Munich has included Greg Lynn's spatial sculpture from the 2002 installation in its permanent collection.

From 2008 to 2014, together with Spitz, he was curating exhibitions at Haus der Gegenwart (Munich), Neues Museum (Nuremberg), Museum of Applied Arts (Cologne), Dortmunder U, Museum of Ethnology (Hamburg) and Today Art Museum (Beijing). Exhibitions followed under his own direction in Shanghai, Tianjin, Tianshui, Chiang Mai and Bangkok.

In 2015 Rendel and the Chinese artist Li Xue founded the art association K29 in Düsseldorf, which advocated freedom of expression in art. Personal differences in the founding phase led to the refounding under the name K26. One of K26's first major projects in the same year was the performance of the Beijing Independent Film Festival (BIFF) during Filmfest Hamburg, which director Albert Wiederspiel made possible as a festival within the festival. The project found renowned supporters such as Alexander Kluge, Michael Kahn-Ackermann and Ai Wei Wei. However, it created diplomatic tensions between Germany and China. The Chinese festival director Li Xianting and his team had to be uninvited and the cooperation ended with immediate effect. The festival nevertheless took place and the winners of the "K26 Film Award" received their prizes at the opening ceremony in Hamburg. Since then the activities of K26 focus on the field of photography.

At the end of 2018, there was cooperation with Germany - Land of Ideas, a joint initiative of the Federal Government and German industry, represented by the Federation of German Industries (BDI). As part of the international Beyond Bauhaus - Prototyping the Future competition, Rendel initiated a cooperation with the Zhuhai campus of Beijing Institute of Technology, which co-organized the competition in the People's Republic of China. This was followed by a guest professorship and the appointment as honorary professor (Prof. h.c. P.R. of China). The managing director of "Germany - Land of Ideas", Ute E. Weiland, appointed Rendel as Ambassador to "Germany - Land of Ideas" in China.

In addition to Zhuhai, Rendel has also been a visiting professor at King Mongkut's Institute of Technology Ladkrabang in Bangkok since 2019. Numerous guest lectures and lectures have led him to Peter Behrens School of Arts (Düsseldorf), Tianjin Academy of Fine Arts (Tianjin), Communication University of China (Beijing), Sichuan Fine Arts Institute (Chongqing), RFH University of Applied Sciences (Cologne), College of Arts, Media and Technology (Chiang Mai), HMKW University for Media, Communication and Economics (Berlin, Cologne), and DIPLOMA University of Applied Sciences (Hannover).

Exhibitions & Festivals (selection) 
 2019 "Invisible Things" TCDC Museum, Bangkok, curated with Philip Cornwel-Smith and Piboon Amornjiraporn
 2018 "Invisible Things", TCDC Museum, Chiang Mai, curated with Philip Cornwel-Smith and Piboon Amornjiraporn
 2018 "The Second Image of Silk Road", Tianshui Photography Biennale, guest curator
 2016 "Parabiosis", Changjiang Museum of Contemporary Art, Chongqing, guest curator
2015 "Chinese Independent Cinema", EthnoFilmFest Munich, curated with Stefan Eisenhofer
 2015 "Beijing Independent Film Festival", Filmfest Hamburg, curated with Jens Geiger
 2015 "Jiang Jian", Gallery Julian Sander, curated with Julian Sander and Catherine Cheng
2014 "August Sander & Jiang Jian", Photo Shanghai, curated with Julian Sander and Catherine Cheng
 2014 "Purple.Blue.", A tribute to Kong Qian No. 6 Zone Museum of Art, Tianjin, curated with Catherine Cheng
 2014 "Jiang Jian – Archives" PhotoBookMuseum, Cologne, curated with Markus Schaden and Catherine Cheng
 2014 "Invisible Things" Museum am Rothenbaum - Cultures and Arts of the World, Hamburg, curated with Wu Xuefu and René Spitz
 2013 "Invisible Things", Today Art Museum, Beijing, curated with Wu Xuefu and René Spitz
 2011 "Reihenhausmannskost", MAKK - Museum of Applied Arts Cologne, curated with René Spitz
 2010 "Neighbourhood", Neues Museum, Nuremberg, curated with René Spitz
 2008 "In German Terraced Houses", MAKK - Museum of Applied Arts Cologne, curated with René Spitz
 2007 "Cabinet Pieces", Excelsior Hotel Ernst, Cologne, during RheinDesign Festival, curated with René Spitz
 2006 "Dear Diary", Eigelstein 115, Cologne, curated with René Spitz 
 2004 "Not identified", Eigelstein 115, Cologne, curated with René Spitz
 2003 "Blossoming Gap", Eigelstein 115, Cologne, curated with René Spitz
 2002 "Expanding the Gap", Eigelstein 115, Cologne, curated with René Spitz
 2001 "Daring the Gap", Eigelstein 115, Cologne, curated with René Spitz

Awards (selection) 
 core design award, Stockholm 2001
 iF Design Award, Hannover 2002
 red dot award: best of the best Communication Design, Essen 2001
 red dot award Communication Design, Essen 2001 and 2002
 DDC award, Frankfurt am Main 2001
 Berliner Type, Berlin 2001
 German Design Award (officially nominated), Frankfurt am Main 2002 and 2004

Publications (selection) 
Published with K26 Sino-German Art Association by Kettler:

 2016 "Archives on Orphans", photographs by Jiang Jian, 
 2015 "Negatives", photographs by Xu Yong, 

Edited with Daniel Arnold and René Spitz at Callwey, Munich:

 2013 "Wir bauen Deutschland – We are building Germany", 
 2011 "Reihenhausmannskost – Home cooking in terraced houses", 
 2010 "Ein Schloss in der Stadt – A castle in the city", 
 2009 "Nachbarschaft – Neighbourhood", 
 2008 "In deutschen Reihenhäusern – In German terraced houses", 

Edited with René Spitz at Axel Menges, Stuttgart / London:

 2006 "Dear Diary", 
 2005 "Unfilled gap", 
 2004 "Not identified", 
 2003 "Blossoming gap", 
 2002 "Expanding the gap", 
 2001 "Daring the gap", 

Edited with "De Blinde Schilders" Foundation, Amsterdam:

 1999 "De Valigia in Austria"
 1998 "De Valigia in Hungary"
 1997 "De Valigia in Yugoslavia"
 1996 "De Valigia in Greece"
 1996 "De Valigia in Denmark"

References

External links 
 Martin Rendel in the Catalogue of the German National Library
 Official Website of Martin Rendel
 Martin Rendel at King Mongkut's Institute of Technology Ladkrabang on Vimeo
 Martin Rendel at German Wikipedia

Living people
1968 births
Academic staff of Beijing Institute of Technology
People from Limburg an der Lahn